Kyrgyzstan competed at the 2000 Summer Olympics in Sydney, Australia. Kyrgyzstan won their first Olympic medal at these games. 48 competitors, 35 men and 13 women, took part in 59 events in 9 sports.

Medalists

Athletics

Men's Competition
Men's Javelin Throw
 Dmitriy Shnayder
 Qualifying – 66.40 (→ did not advance)

Men's Hammer Throw
 Nikolay Davydov
 Qualifying – no mark (→ did not advance)

Men's Marathon
 Nazirdin Akylbekov
 Final – 2:31:26 (→ 70th place)

Women's Competition
Women's 400 m
 Oksana Luneva
 Round 1 – 54.98 (→ did not advance)

Women's Javelin Throw
 Tatyana Sudarikova
 Qualifying – 48.33 (→ did not advance)

Women's Long Jump
 Elena Bobrovskaia
 Qualifying – 6.19 (→ did not advance)

Women's High Jump
 Tatyana Efimenko
 Qualifying – no mark (→ did not advance)

Women's Marathon
 Irina Bogachova
 Final – 2:29:55 (→ 14th place)

Boxing

Men's Bantamweight (– 54 kg)
Taalaibek Kadiraliev
Round 1 – Defeated Ngoudjo Herman of Cameroon
Round 2 – Lost to Clarence Vinson of United States (→ did not advance)

Men's Lightweight (– 60 kg)
Almazbek Raiymkulov
Round 1 – Defeated Tumentsetseg Uitumen of Mongolia
Round 2 – Defeated José Leonardo Cruz of Colombia
Quarterfinal – Lost to Cristian Bejarano of Mexico (→ did not advance)

Men's Light Middleweight (– 71 kg)
Nurbek Kasenov
Round 1 – Lost to Hely Yanes of Venezuela (→ did not advance)

Men's Middleweight (– 75 kg)
Vladislav Vizilter
Round 1 – Bye
Round 2 – Lost to Zsolt Erdei of Hungary (→ did not advance)

Men's Light Heavyweight (– 81 kg)
Alexey Katulievsky
Round 1 – Defeated George Olwande Odindo of Kenya
Round 2 – Lost to John Dovi of France (→ did not advance)

Cycling

Road Cycling
Men's Individual Time Trial
 Evgeny Wacker
 Final – 1:00:21 (→ 17th place)

Men's Road Race
 Evgeny Wacker
 Final – did not finish (→ no ranking)

Fencing

One male fencer represented Kyrgyzstan in 2000.

Men's épée
 Aleksandr Poddubny

Judo

Olga Artamonova 
Women's half middleweight – T9th place

Shooting

Swimming

Men's 50 m Freestyle
 Sergey Ashihmin
 Preliminary Heat – 23.53 (→ did not advance)

Men's 100 m Freestyle
 Sergey Ashihmin
 Preliminary Heat – 51.28 (→ did not advance)

Men's 200 m Freestyle
 Dmitri Kuzmin
 Preliminary Heat – 1:52.93 (→ did not advance)

Men's 400 m Freestyle
 Ivan Ivanov
 Preliminary Heat – 04:09.33 (→ did not advance)

Men's 1500 m Freestyle
 Ivan Ivanov
 Preliminary Heat – DSQ (→ did not advance)

Men's 100 m Butterfly
 Konstantin Ushkov
 Preliminary Heat – 55.25 (→ did not advance)

Men's 200 m Butterfly
 Konstantin Andriushin
 Preliminary Heat – 02:04.86 (→ did not advance)

Men's 100 m Breaststroke
 Evgeny Petrashov
 Preliminary Heat – 01:07.32 (→ did not advance)

Men's 200 m Breaststroke
 Alexandr Tkachev
 Preliminary Heat – 02:15.63 (→ did not advance)

Men's 100 m Backstroke
 Konstantin Prayhkin
 Preliminary Heat – 59.86 (→ did not advance)

Men's 200 m Backstroke
 Aleksandr Yegorov
 Preliminary Heat – 02:13.86 (→ did not advance)

Men's 200 m Individual Medley
 Andrei Pakin
 Preliminary Heat – 02:07.88 (→ did not advance)

Men's 4 × 100 m Freestyle
 Sergey Ashihmin, Konstantin Ushkov, Dmitri Kuzmin, and Alexei Pavlov
 Preliminary Heat – 03:25.03 (→ did not advance)

Men's 4 × 200 m Freestyle
 Andrei Pakin, Dmitri Kuzmin, Alexandr Shilin, and Ivan Ivanov
 Preliminary Heat – DSQ (→ did not advance)

Men's 4 × 100 m Medley
 Alexandr Tkachev, Alexandr Shilin, Konstantin Ushkov, and Sergey Ashihmin
 Preliminary Heat – 03:46.70 (→ did not advance)

Women's 50 m Freestyle
 Ekaterina Tochenaya
 Preliminary Heat – 26.88 (→ did not advance)

Women's 100 m Freestyle
 Ekaterina Tochenaya
 Preliminary Heat – 58.8 (→ did not advance)

Women's 200 m Freestyle
 Anna Korshikova
 Preliminary Heat – 02:08.08 (→ did not advance)

Women's 400 m Freestyle
 Nataliya Korabelnikova
 Preliminary Heat – 04:24.29 (→ did not advance)

Women's 100 m Breaststroke
 Olga Moltchanova
 Preliminary Heat – 01:14.41 (→ did not advance)

Women's 200 m Breaststroke
 Olga Moltchanova
 Preliminary Heat – 02:41.43 (→ did not advance)

Women's 100 m Backstroke
 Anjelika Solovieva
 Preliminary Heat – 01:07.63 (→ did not advance)

Women's 200 m Individual Medley
 Alexandra Zertsalova
 Preliminary Heat – 02:24.09 (→ did not advance)

Women's 400 m Individual Medley
 Alexandra Zertsalova
 Preliminary Heat – 05:09.03 (→ did not advance)

Women's 4 × 200 m Freestyle
 Nataliya Korabelnikova, Anna Korshikova, Anjelika Solovieva, and Ekaterina Tochenaya
 Preliminary Heat – 08:41.21 (→ did not advance)

Weightlifting

Men

Wrestling

Notes

Wallechinsky, David (2004). The Complete Book of the Summer Olympics (Athens 2004 Edition). Toronto, Canada. .
International Olympic Committee (2001). The Results. Retrieved 12 November 2005.
Sydney Organising Committee for the Olympic Games (2001). Official Report of the XXVII Olympiad Volume 1: Preparing for the Games. Retrieved 20 November 2005.
Sydney Organising Committee for the Olympic Games (2001). Official Report of the XXVII Olympiad Volume 2: Celebrating the Games. Retrieved 20 November 2005.
Sydney Organising Committee for the Olympic Games (2001). The Results. Retrieved 20 November 2005.
International Olympic Committee Web Site

References

Nations at the 2000 Summer Olympics
2000
2000 in Kyrgyzstani sport